Florian Adel Makhedjouf (born 11 January 1991) is an Algerian professional footballer who plays as a midfielder, most recently for Stade Lavallois.

Club career
Makhedjouf began his career at age 6 with local club ES Vitry. The following year he joined US Villejuif where he played until age 13 before spending two seasons with US Ivry. There he was spotted by Pierre Reynaud of Paris Saint-Germain and was signed to the club. In June 2010, he was part of the PSG Under-19 team that won the Under-19 National Championship, beating Monaco 4–2 on penalties in the final.

On 15 December 2010, Makhedjouf made his professional debut for Paris Saint-Germain in a 2010–11 UEFA Europa League group stage match against Karpaty Lviv. He came in as a substitute in the 91st minute in place of Mevlüt Erdinç. At the end of the season, the club announced that Makhedjouf's contract would not be extended and he was free to leave.

Sedan
On 23 June 2011, Makhedjouf signed a three-year contract with Ligue 2 side CS Sedan Ardennes.

Red Star
Following Sedan's fall to the lower divisions due to financial problems, Makhedjouf was left a free agent by the end of the 2012–13 season. He then signed with third-tier team Red Star F.C.

International career
On 17 November 2009, Makhedjouf was called up to the Algerian Under-20 national team for a friendly against Tunisia.

Personal life
Makhedjouf was born in Ivry-sur-Seine, France, to an Algerian father and an Italian mother. His father is originally from the town of Aïn Fakroun.

References

External links
 

1991 births
Living people
People from Ivry-sur-Seine
Footballers from Val-de-Marne
Association football midfielders
Algerian footballers
Algeria youth international footballers
Paris Saint-Germain F.C. players
CS Sedan Ardennes players
Red Star F.C. players
Stade Lavallois players
Tours FC players
Ligue 2 players
Championnat National players
French sportspeople of Algerian descent
Algerian people of Italian descent
French people of Italian descent